Fashion Fever may refer to:

 Fashion Fever (Princess Gwenevere and the Jewel Riders), an episode of the TV series Princess Gwenevere and the Jewel Riders
 "Fashion Fever" (song), by Level 42 on the 1987 album Running in the Family